Nebraska Highway 96 is a highway in central Nebraska.  It has a western terminus at an intersection with U.S. Highway 183 north of Taylor.  Its eastern terminus is at Nebraska Highway 91 just to the south of Burwell.

Route description
Nebraska Highway 96 begins north of Taylor at US 183.  It heads in a southeasterly direction, passing by the Calamus Lake/Reservoir to the south. It then heads southward and to the east heading into Burwell.  The highway turns to the south in Burwell, before terminating at NE 91 just outside Burwell's southern limits.

Major intersections

References

External links

The Nebraska Highways Page: Highways 61 to 100

096
Transportation in Loup County, Nebraska
Transportation in Garfield County, Nebraska